Up for the Down Stroke is an album by the American funk band Parliament. It was the band's second album (following 1970's Osmium), and their first to be released on Casablanca Records. The album was released on July 3, 1974. Its title track was Parliament's first chart hit and remains one of the most well-known P-Funk songs. The album also contains a funk reworking of The Parliaments' song "(I Wanna) Testify" under the title "Testify". The original title of the album was Whatever Makes Baby Feel Good, and the cover  featured group leader George Clinton hovering over a woman in distress, sporting a black wig and monster-type gloves.

Up for the Down Stroke is notable in that it regenerated George Clinton's professional relationship with bassist Bootsy Collins, who had taken a two-year hiatus from the group. Collins would play a pivotal role in all of the Parliament albums released through Casablanca Records.

Track listing

Side One
 "Up for the Down Stroke" (George Clinton, Bootsy Collins, Fuzzy Haskins, Bernie Worrell) – 5:10 (released as a single-Casablanca 0013)
 "Testify" (George Clinton, Deron Taylor) – 3:49 (released as a single-Casablanca 811)
 "The Goose" (George Clinton, Eddie Hazel) – 9:13 (released as a single-Casablanca 0003)
 "I Can Move You (If You Let Me)" (George Clinton, Cordell Mosson, Bernie Worrell, Bootsy Collins) – 2:47

Side Two
 "I Just Got Back (From the Fantasy, Ahead of Our Time in the Four Lands of Ellet)" (Peter Chase) – 4:33
 "All Your Goodies Are Gone" (George Clinton, Fuzzy Haskins, Billy "Bass" Nelson) – 5:07
 "Whatever Makes Baby Feel Good" (George Clinton, Eddie Hazel) – 6:01
 "Presence of a Brain" (George Clinton, Garry Shider) – 3:19

Bonus tracks from 2003 remaster

 "Up for the Down Stroke (Alternate Mix)" – 5:39
 "Testify (Alternate Mix)" – 4:03
 "Singing Another Song (Previously Unreleased)" – 3:04

Personnel

Bernie Worrell – Arrangement, Keyboards
Eddie Hazel – Guitar, Arrangement, Vocals
Bootsy Collins – Bass, Guitar, Drums
Gary Bronson – Drums
Ron Bykowski – Guitar
Peter Chase – Whistling
George Clinton – Arrangement, Vocals, Producer
Raymond Davis – Vocals
Ramon "Tiki" Fulwood – Drums
Clarence "Fuzzy" Haskins – Vocals
Cordell Mosson – Bass
Ralph – Engineer
Garry Shider – Guitar, Vocals
Calvin Simon – Vocals
Grady Thomas – Vocals
Tom "Curly" Ruff – Mastering
Rod Dyer – Design
Jon Echeverrieta – Design

References

1974 albums
Parliament (band) albums
Casablanca Records albums